George Hubert Graham Doggart  (18 July 1925 – 16 February 2018) was an English sports administrator, first-class cricketer and schoolmaster.

Background
Doggart was born into a sporting family at Earl's Court, London, the elder son of the sportsman Graham Doggart. He was educated at Winchester College where he was captain of cricket and football. On leaving school he was commissioned in the Coldstream Guards. He then went up to King's College, Cambridge where he graduated with a Master of Arts degree.

Sporting career
He was a Cambridge blue in five different sports (cricket, football, rackets, squash and Rugby fives) and captain in four and was a successful amateur cricketer for Cambridge University and Sussex (where he was captain in 1954). He made an unbeaten 215 against Lancashire on his Cambridge University debut in 1948 and this score remains the highest made by a debutant in English cricket. He represented England in two Test matches versus the West Indies in 1950 (at Old Trafford and Lord's). Teaching commitments meant that he only played one full summer of county cricket, in 1954.

He later held several offices in sports administration, such as President of the Marylebone Cricket Club (MCC) (1981–1982), the Cricket Council (1981–1982), the English Schools Cricket Association (1965–2000) and the Cricket Society (1983–1998). He also chaired the ICC (1981–1982) and the Friends of Arundel Castle Cricket Club (1993–2003).

Personal life
He taught at Winchester College from 1950 to 1972 and was headmaster at King's School, Bruton from 1972 to 1985. Doggart died peacefully at his Chichester home on 16 February 2018 aged 92. He left a widow, Susan, whom he married in 1960. They had a son and two daughters.

References

External links
 

1925 births
2018 deaths
Cambridge University cricketers
Coldstream Guards officers
English cricket administrators
England Test cricketers
Marylebone Cricket Club cricketers
Presidents of the Marylebone Cricket Club
Heads of schools in England
Sussex cricket captains
Sussex cricketers
Officers of the Order of the British Empire
Alumni of King's College, Cambridge
People educated at Winchester College
English cricketers
Free Foresters cricketers
North v South cricketers
Gentlemen cricketers
20th-century British Army personnel